Kageyama (written: ,  or ) is a Japanese surname. Notable people with the surname include:
, Japanese voice actress
, Japanese volleyball player
, Japanese musician and singer
Isaku Kageyama (born 1982), American musician
, Japanese psychiatrist
, Japanese baseball player and manager
, Japanese footballer
, Japanese field hockey player
, Japanese racing driver
, Japanese racing driver
, Japanese footballer
Rodney Kageyama (1941–2018), American actor
, Japanese animation director
, Japanese footballer
, Japanese writer
, Japanese Go player
, Japanese footballer

Fictional characters
, protagonist of the manga series Mob Psycho 100
, a character in the manga series Mob Psycho 100
, a character in the manga series Haikyu!!
, a character from the adventure game Kimi ga Shine -Tasūketsu Death Game-

Japanese-language surnames